The 1969–70 Serie A season was the 36th season of the Serie A, the top level of ice hockey in Italy. Four teams participated in the league, and SG Cortina won the championship.

Regular season

External links
 Season on hockeytime.net

1969–70 in Italian ice hockey
Serie A (ice hockey) seasons
Italy